Zanoni is an unincorporated community located in Ozark County, Missouri, United States on Route 181, approximately ten miles northeast of Gainesville. A watermill (doubling as a bed and breakfast) and a post office are all that remain of the community. The community was founded in 1898 and was named for the novel Zanoni by Edward Bulwer-Lytton. The mill was built in 1905 as an overshot wheel mill by "Doc" Morrison and restored by his grandson.

The mill is located where the Zanoni Spring arises from openings in the Roubidoux Formation, an Ordovician unit of mixed sandstone and dolomite. The spring discharges at the base of a ridge above Pine Creek, a tributary of Caney Creek which discharges into Bryant Creek just above its intersection with North Fork River and Norfork Lake.

References

Unincorporated communities in Ozark County, Missouri
Unincorporated communities in Missouri